Royal Santana (May 1971 – 1995) was a sorrel Quarter Horse gelding sired by Peppy San and out of a mare named Royal Smart. Royal Smart was a daughter of Royal King and out of a descendant of Traveler named Moss Jackie Tobin.

In Royal Santana's show career he was an American Quarter Horse Association (or AQHA) World Champion and Reserve World Champion. With the National Cutting Horse Association (or NCHA) he earned $174,146.29 in cutting contests and a Platinum, Gold, Silver, Bronze and Certificate of Ability from the NCHA.

Royal Santana was inducted into the AQHA Hall of Fame in 2000. After he died in 1995, they buried him next to the arena named in his honor at Merrill’s Windward Stud.

Source:

Notes

References
 All Breed Pedigree Database Pedigree of Royal Santana accessed on October 6, 2007
 American Quarter Horse Foundation - Royal Santana accessed on September 2, 2017
 AQHA Hall of Fame accessed on September 2, 2017
 NCHA Earnings Lookup accessed on September 4, 2017
 Royal Santana at Quarter Horse Directory accessed on October 6, 2007

External links
 Royal Santana at Quarter Horse Legends

American Quarter Horse show horses
Cutting horses
1971 animal births
1995 animal deaths
AQHA Hall of Fame (horses)